The 2015 NBA Africa Game was an exhibition basketball game played on August 1, 2015 in Ellis Park Arena in Johannesburg, South Africa. It was the first NBA game, and the first game involving any major North American professional sports league, to take place on the continent of Africa. It was contested between Team Africa, featuring NBA players and alumni that were born in or had parents born in Africa, and Team World, featuring NBA players from the rest of the world.

Team World won the exhibition game by a score of 101–97.

Rosters 

CAP Deng was the captain for Team Africa.
CAP Paul was the captain for Team World.
INJ Ibaka was unable to participate because of injury.

Coaches and managers 
San Antonio Spurs head coach, three-time NBA Coach of the Year, and five time NBA champion Gregg Popovich coached Team Africa, including his team's Boris Diaw. Mike Budenholzer, who was named Coach of the Year for the prior NBA season, and Monty Williams served as assistant coaches for the African side. Billy King, general manager for the Brooklyn Nets, held that position for Africa along with former NBA Executive of the Year and Nigerian native Masai Ujiri of the Toronto Raptors.

Team World was coached by Lionel Hollins and assistant Brad Stevens. They were managed by Spurs' general manager R. C. Buford.

Notes

References 

2015–16 NBA season
2015 in African basketball
2015 in South African sport
International basketball competitions hosted by South Africa
National Basketball Association games
August 2015 sports events in Africa